Microsoft Windows is the name of several families of computer software operating systems created by Microsoft. Microsoft first introduced an operating environment named Windows in November 1985 as an add-on to MS-DOS in response to the growing interest in graphical user interfaces (GUIs).

All versions of Microsoft Windows are commercial proprietary software.

General information
Basic general information about Windows.

DOS shells

 Has partial 32-bit compatibility with Win32s

Windows 9x

Windows NT

 has also an N-edition
 has also an N-edition
 has also an N-edition
 has a separate x64-edition
 has also a Core-edition
 has also an edition without HyperV
 has also a Core-edition without HyperV

Windows Embedded Compact
Windows Embedded Compact (Windows CE) is a variation of Microsoft's Windows operating system for minimalistic computers and embedded systems. Windows CE is a distinctly different kernel, rather than a trimmed-down version of desktop Windows. It is supported on Intel x86 and compatibles, MIPS, ARM, and Hitachi SuperH processors.

Windows IoT
The Windows IoT family is the successor to the now-discontinued Windows Embedded family.

Windows Mobile
Windows Mobile is Microsoft's discontinued line of operating systems for smartphones.

Windows Phone
Windows Phone is Microsoft's discontinued line of operating systems for smartphones.

Technical information

DOS shells

Windows 9x

It is possible to install the MS-DOS variants 7.0 and 7.1 without the graphics user interface of Windows. If an independent installation of both, DOS and Windows is desired, DOS ought to be installed prior to Windows, at the start of a small partition. The system must be transferred by the (dangerous) "SYSTEM" DOS-command, while the other files constituting DOS can simply be copied (the files located in the DOS-root and the entire COMMAND directory). Such a stand-alone installation of MS-DOS 8 is not possible, as it is designed to work as real mode for Windows Me and nothing else.

Windows NT
The Windows NT kernel powers all recent Windows operating systems. It has run on IA-32, x64, DEC Alpha, MIPS architecture, PowerPC, Itanium, ARMv7, and ARM64 processors, but currently supported versions run on IA-32, x64, ARMv7, and ARM64.

Windows Phone

Supported file systems
Various versions of Windows support various file systems, including:FAT12, FAT16, FAT32, HPFS, or NTFS, along with network file systems shared from other computers, and the ISO 9660 and UDF file systems used for CDs, DVDs, and other optical disc drives such as Blu-ray. Each file system is usually limited in application to certain media, for example CDs must use ISO 9660 or UDF, and as of Windows Vista, NTFS is the only file system which the operating system can be installed on. Windows Embedded CE 6.0, Windows Vista Service Pack 1, and Windows Server 2008 onwards support exFAT, a file system more suitable for USB flash drives.

Windows 9x

Windows NT

Windows Phone

Hardware requirements
Installing Windows requires an internal or external optical drive, or a USB flash drive. A keyboard and mouse are the recommended input devices, though some versions support a touchscreen. For operating systems prior to Vista, an optical drive must be capable of reading CD media, while in Windows Vista onwards, such a drive must be DVD-compatible. The drive may be detached after installing Windows.

Windows 9x

Windows NT

Windows Phone

Physical memory limits
Maximum limits on physical memory (RAM) that Windows can address vary depending on both the Windows version and between IA-32 and x64 versions.

Windows

Windows NT

Security features

Features

Timeline

See also

Other lists
List of Microsoft Windows versions
List of operating systems
Comparison of operating systems
Comparison of kernels
Comparison of Windows Vista and Windows XP
History of Microsoft Windows
Comparison of DOS operating systems
Architecture of the Windows NT operating system line
Microsoft codenames

Windows clones and emulators
Freedows OS–Windows clone
ReactOS–project to develop an operating system that is binary compatible with application software and device drivers for Microsoft Windows NT version 5.x
Wine (software)–compatibility layer which allows to execute programs that were originally written for Microsoft Windows

References

External links

Time line from Microsoft

Microsoft Windows